Carl Donald Bell (August 25, 1925 – March 17, 1966), better known by his ring name Chief Don Eagle, was a Mohawk boxer and professional wrestler during the 1950s and 1960s. Originally from Kahnawake, Quebec, he became Boston's AWA World Heavyweight Champion in 1950.

Professional wrestling career 
Eagle began a boxing career in 1945, after a brief time working in the steel and construction industry. He was trained solely by his father, Chief Joseph War Eagle, a former Junior Heavyweight Champion. In his first year, Eagle competed in 22 contests and won 17. He beat an already established Red Dawson using a pinfall in just under 16 minutes. During the peak of his career in the early 1950s, Eagle became the first person to throw World Heavyweight Boxing Champion Primo Carnera off his feet. He fought Antonino Rocca in a 60-minute draw on May 19, 1951, at the Chicago Stadium.

Controversy over AWA World Title (Boston) 
On May 23, 1950, Eagle defeated Frank Sexton in a best-of-three falls. Sexton was just over a year into a near-four-year reign of the Boston version of the AWA World Heavyweight Championship.

Three days later, Eagle appeared on television without the championship belt to face Gorgeous George in another best-of-three falls match in the Chicago area. For the first fall, Eagle defeated George by submission. For the second, Eagle was counted out by referee Earl Mullihan. In the final fall, George managed to catch Eagle with a backyard entry cradle. Mullihan, who could clearly see that Eagle had a single shoulder off the mat, proceeded to administer another fast count and declared the match over. The crowd was furious and began to riot, throwing objects into the ring. Eagle punched Mullihan with considerable force while Mullihan hastened to leave the ring and the arena. As Mullihan ran up the aisle, Eagle hit him forcefully again between the shoulder blades. Eagle was suspended by the Illinois State Athletic Commission for putting his hands on a referee but managed to regain the title on August 31, 1950. The title was declared vacant in November 1950 due to Eagle's inactivity because of injury and was replaced by the AWA Eastern Heavyweight Title.

Later career 
During a 1953 match with the faux-Nazi Hans Schmidt, Eagle was thrown over the top rope and into the ringside chairs, damaging several spinal discs and breaking two ribs. Eagle took a year off to recover from his injuries, during which time he began training a teenage Billy Two Rivers. Eagle gave Two Rivers a further year's training after he himself had returned to wrestling, occasionally tagging with the young wrestler. He would wrestle for American Wrestling Association (Minnesota) in 1960 when the promotion first started. Due to continuing back problems, Eagle became semi-retired and wrestled infrequently in various regions over the next three years. Eagle decided to retire permanently in 1965 at the age of 39.

Death 
Wrestling Revue reported Eagle's death on March 17, 1966, stating it appeared he died from a self-inflicted gunshot wound. Contemporaneous newspaper reports indicated he had been despondent over some construction project setbacks: namely, a Logan County (Ohio) Indian village, an expansion program in the Zane Shawnee Caverns, and a $12 million Indian Center near Montreal. Those close to Eagle. including Billy Two Rivers, do not believe his death was a suicide. Skeptics noted it could have been a murder, connected to the death of his wife, Jean Eagle.

Championships and accomplishments

Boxing
Cleveland Golden Gloves Heavyweight Championship (1945)

Professional wrestling
American Wrestling Association (Boston)
AWA World Heavyweight Championship (2 times)
Canadian Wrestling Hall of Fame
Class of 2016
Fred Kohler Enterprises
World Heavyweight Championship (Illinois version)
Midwest Wrestling Association (Ohio)
MWA World Heavyweight Championship (Ohio version)'' (1 time)

Professional boxing record

See also
 List of premature professional wrestling deaths

References

External links 
 The Way It Was -- Don Eagle by Percival A. Friend
 And Another Indian Bites The Dust by Bill McCormack
 

1925 births
1966 deaths
20th-century First Nations people
Boxing people from Quebec
Canadian expatriate professional wrestlers in the United States
Canadian male boxers
Canadian male professional wrestlers
Canadian Mohawk people
Deaths by firearm in Quebec
First Nations professional wrestlers
Heavyweight boxers
People from Montérégie
Professional wrestlers from Quebec
Suicides by firearm in Quebec
20th-century professional wrestlers